Diego Hidalgo and Cristian Rodríguez were the defending champions but only Rodríguez chose to defend his title, partnering Luis David Martínez. Rodríguez lost in the first round to Hugo and Murkel Dellien.

Guido Andreozzi and Guillermo Durán won the title after defeating Luciano Darderi and Oleg Prihodko 7–6(7–1), 6–7(3–7), [10–7] in the final.

Seeds

Draw

References

External links
 Main draw

Challenger Concepción - Doubles